Đorović (also transliterated Djorović) is a Serbian surname. Notable people with the surname include:

 Goran Đorović (born 1971), Serbian football manager and former player
 Predrag Đorović (born 1983), Serbian footballer

Serbian surnames
Slavic-language surnames
Patronymic surnames